"All Roads Lead to You" is a song written by Kye Fleming and Dennis Morgan, and recorded by American country music artist Steve Wariner.  It was released in September 1981 as the third single from the album Steve Wariner.  The song was Wariner's third country hit and the first of nine number one country singles.  The single stayed at number one for one week and spent a total of twelve weeks on the chart.

Charts

References

1981 singles
1981 songs
Steve Wariner songs
Songs written by Kye Fleming
Songs written by Dennis Morgan (songwriter)
Song recordings produced by Tom Collins (record producer)
RCA Records singles